The Mumbles Lifeboat Station (based in Mumbles, Swansea, Wales) opened in 1835 with a lifeboat that was funded and managed by Swansea Harbour Trustees and was known as Swansea Lifeboat Station. The station was taken over by the RNLI in 1863 and moved to Mumbles in 1866. The station only officially became The Mumbles Lifeboat Station in 1904.

The station currently operates a  lifeboat and a  lifeboat, and operates from a boathouse at the end of Mumbles Pier.

History
When the station first opened, it did not have a boathouse and the lifeboat was stored under the cliffs. In 1866 the first boathouse was built and it was replaced with a larger boathouse when a replacement lifeboat needed more room. A slipway was constructed for launching the lifeboat in 1888 and in 1897, Mumbles Railway and Pier Company constructed a new slipway for the RNLI at no cost to the institution. Another new slipway was built in 1916 and it was extended and had alterations made to it in 1922.

During a gale on Saturday, 27 January 1883, a German barque Admiral Prinz Aldabert was driven on to rocks near the Mumbles Lighthouse. Wolverhampton went out to assist and was washed on to rocks. The lifeboat broke up and four crew drowned and other members missing or seriously injured.

In 1947 the lifeboat Edward, Prince of Wales and her crew of 8 were lost while assisting  which had run aground on Sker Point.

Today

The D-class lifeboat is the main workhorse of the station, being used for more than 60 percent of the callouts. In 2014 a new Tamar class lifeboat entered service at The Mumbles, temporarily based at Swansea Marina while a new, larger, boathouse and slipway were constructed on the end of Mumbles pier. In 2015 and 2016, Mumbles was the busiest station in Wales, launching 83 times.

Fleet

All weather boats

Inshore lifeboats

Station honours

Four crewmen of the sand dredger Steepholm were saved by the Atlantic College lifeboat and the Porthcawl lifeboat in partnership with the Mumbles lifeboat in 1968.

References

External links
 RNLI website: Mumbles lifeboat station
 Facebook page: Mumbles lifeboat station facebook page
 “The Second Mumbles Lifeboat Disaster: 1st February 1903 - lifeboat James Stevens No.12,” by Kate Jones

Lifeboat stations in Wales
Swansea Bay
Transport infrastructure completed in 1835